Yanaz is a village in the Bartın District, Bartın Province, Turkey. Its population is 725 (2021).

Geography 
Village distance is 15 km from the centre of Bartın. The economy of the village is generally based on agriculture and cattle-breeding.

Population

References

Villages in Bartın District